David Wladimir Serradas Suárez (born May 17, 1969 in Valencia, Carabobo) is a former Venezuelan boxer, competing in the flyweight division.

Serradas competed for his native country at the 1992 Summer Olympics in Barcelona, Spain, where he was defeated in the quarterfinals of the Men's Flyweight (– 51 kg) by Cuba's eventual silver medalist Raúl González. A year earlier he captured the silver medal in the same division at the 1991 Pan American Games.

References

External links 
 
 
 

1969 births
Living people
Sportspeople from Valencia, Venezuela
Flyweight boxers
Olympic boxers of Venezuela
Boxers at the 1991 Pan American Games
Boxers at the 1992 Summer Olympics
Venezuelan male boxers
Pan American Games silver medalists for Venezuela
Pan American Games medalists in boxing
Central American and Caribbean Games gold medalists for Venezuela
Competitors at the 1990 Central American and Caribbean Games
Central American and Caribbean Games medalists in boxing
Medalists at the 1991 Pan American Games
20th-century Venezuelan people
21st-century Venezuelan people